Toyooka Station (豊岡駅) is the name of two train stations in Japan:

 Toyooka Station (Hyōgo)
 Toyooka Station (Shizuoka)